Murgatroyd (with variants including Murgatroid and Margatroid) is a surname among the English nobility, originating in Yorkshire. Its etymology, according to one source, is as follows: in 1371, a constable was appointed for the district of Warley in Yorkshire. He adopted the name of Johanus de Morgateroyde, or literally: Johanus of Moor Gate Royde or 'the district leading to the moor'.
Another source says the place name means Margaret's road.
In Old Norse, royd means "clearing" (as in cutting down forest for agriculture). Although Moorgate in London was a gate with the road to the moor passing through, in Yorkshire, gate (again from Old Norse) means "street", so Moor Gate Royd would be 'a clearing in the forest on the road to the moor'.

Moor-gate-royd or Murgatroyd as of 1432 when a John Murgatroyd of Murgatroyd was first recorded as residing there, is on the Southern slopes of Highroad Well Moor. A variation in spelling is seen in 1452, as Morgadrode, the surname of a Halifax yeoman. 

Murgatroyd, the stately home and seat of the family, was badly damaged during the Battle of the Hollins (named after the forest below the estate) on 23 October 1643 when Colonel Bradshaw, Captain Taylor, two Lancashire Companies, and eleven 'Clubists' marched to the fortified Murgatroyd that had been at the disposal of Sir Francis Mackworth and contained the family-backed Royalists and accompanying munitions.

"The Royalist captain would no doubt have made ready for the attack. He was pleasantly engaged in a tete-a-tete with his host James Murgatroyd and his good wife Mary, on the invincibility of their sturdy homestead, when suddenly they were arrested by the ping of Roundhead bullets. It wasn't exactly a Marston Moor, this battle of the Hollins, but quite sufficiently exciting while it lasted. Both sides fought with great valour, not only with guns and swords but also after the manner of the Middle Ages, by hurling great stones at the heads of the enemy".

With much of Murgatroyd damaged in the battle, James Murgatroyd, the Head Greave of Warley, moved the family seat to one of the other estates, East Riddlesden Hall. The National Trust property is most associated with the family to this day.

American vaudevillian and actor Burt Lahr used the catchphrase "Heavens to Murgatroyd!" in the 1944 Metro-Goldwyn-Mayer musical comedy Meet the People. The phrase was later popularized by the Hanna-Barbera cartoon character Snagglepuss.

People
The name may refer to the following:
 Cecil G. Murgatroyd (1958–2001), long-running satirical political candidate in Australia and New Zealand
 Gavin Murgatroyd (born 1969), Namibian cricketer (previously known as Bryan Murgatroyd)
 Henry Murgatroyd (1853–1905), English cricketer
 Michael Murgatroyd (1925–2004), English-born Scottish nationalist political activist
 Peta Murgatroyd (born 1986), professional dancer
 Stephen Murgatroyd (born 1950), writer, broadcaster and consultant
 Miss Murgatroid, pseudonym of Alicia J. Rose, American musician and singer

Fictional characters

 Miss Murgatroyd, character played by Marie Wilson in the 1936 film Satan Met a Lady
 Major Murgatroyd, Officer of Dragoon Guards, in the Gilbert and Sullivan 1881 opera Patience
 The Murgatroyd family, a line of cursed baronets, in the Gilbert and Sullivan 1887 opera Ruddigore
 The Murgatroyd family of businesspeople, in Fallen London
 Evelyn Murgatroyd, in The Voyage Out, a 1915 novel by Virginia Woolf
 General Murgatroyd, in Highland Fling, a 1931 novel by Nancy Mitford
 Murgatroyd and Winterbottom, a British comedy act consisting of Ronald Frankau and Tommy Handley
 Ambrose Murgatroyd, in the 1941 Preston Sturges movie The Lady Eve
 Miss Amy Murgatroyd, in A Murder Is Announced, a 1950 novel by Agatha Christie
 Murgatroyd, pet rabbit of the eponymous main character in Celia, a 1989 film directed by Ann Turner
 Alice Margatroid in the Touhou Project series of video games
 Murgatroyd, one of Morwen's cats in the Enchanted Forest Chronicles by Patricia Wrede
 Reginald "Reggie" Murgatroid, from The X-Files episode, "The Lost Art of Forehead Sweat"
 Candice and Sam Murgatroyd, in British television programme Ackley Bridge
 Cousin Murgatroyd, a cousin of Big Bird mentioned in Sesame Street Episode 1090
 Murgatroyd, a galactic crime boss in the Lensman series of science fiction novels by Edward Elmer "Doc" Smith
 Murgatroyd, the disgraced former butler of Aunt Dahlia, in the Jeeves and Wooster stories of P. G. Wodehouse.
 Roger Murgatroyd, henpecked husband of Edna Murgatroyd, in the story The Emperor found in Frederick Forsyth's 1972 anthology No Comebacks
 Mr Mergatroid, a love-sick talking robot, in the BBC Radio 4 comedy Time Spanner
 Maris Murgatroyd, the Scholar Mistress of Arcane Arts at the Wundrous Society in the book series Nevermoor by Jessica Townsend
 Freda Murgatroyd, a protagonist in Shrines of Gaiety, by Kate Atkinson

References

English-language surnames